Mercantour National Park a French national park located in the Alpes-de-Haute-Provence and Alpes-Maritimes departments. Since it was created in 1979, the park has proven popular, with 800,000 visitors annually enjoying the 600 km (372 mi) of marked footpaths and visiting its villages.

Extent 

The protected area covers some 679 km2, consisting of a central uninhabited zone comprising seven valleys: Roya, Bévéra, Vésubie, Tinée, Haut Var and Cians (in Alpes-Maritimes) plus Verdon and Ubaye (in Alpes-de-Haute-Provence), as well as a peripheral zone comprising 28 villages.

Many of them are perched villages, such as Belvédère at the entrance to the spectacular Gordolasque valley, concealing great architectural riches (numerous churches decorated with murals and altar pieces by primitive Niçois painters). More than 150 rural sites are located within the Park.  Around Mont Bégo there are petroglyphs pecked out on schist and granite faces. They have been dated from the late Neolithic and Bronze Ages.

Valley of marvels 
In the heart of this setting of vertiginous summits (including Cime du Gélas, the third highest mountain in the Maritime Alps at 3,143 m), lies a gem listed as a Historical Monument, the famous Vallée des Merveilles, the aptly named "valley of marvels". At the foot of Mont Bégo, climbers can admire some 37,000 petroglyphs dating back to the Bronze Age, representing weapons, cattle and human figures that are sometimes very mysterious. A less challenging destination is the Musée des Merveilles at Tende.

Lakes 
Several lakes can be visited, for example the lake of Allos, the lake of the Lauzanier, the lakes of Vens, the lakes of Morgon, and the lakes of the valley of marvels.

Flora 
In addition to the holm oak, the Mediterranean olive tree, rhododendrons, firs, spruces, Swiss pines and above all larches, the Mercantour is also endowed with more than 2,000 species of flowering plants, 200 of which are very rare: edelweiss and martagon lily are the best known, but there is also saxifrage with multiple flowers, houseleek, moss campion and gentian offering a multi-coloured palette in the spring. The Mercantour is the site of a large-scale All Taxa Biodiversity Inventory and Monitoring programme to identify all its living species, organised by the European Distributed Institute of Taxonomy (EDIT).

Fauna 

Walkers may easily glimpse a chamois, several thousand of which live in the park and may often hear the whistling of marmots. The ermine is rarer (and more furtive), as is the ibex and the mouflon, although with a little luck you may be able to observe them during the coolest parts of the day in the summer.
There is a tremendous variety of wildlife in the Mercantour: red deer and roe deer in the undergrowth, hares and wild boars, partridges, golden eagles and buzzards, numerous species of butterflies and even about 50 Italian wolves (which migrated there at the beginning of the 1990s). A Wolves Centre welcomes visitors in Saint-martin-Vésubie.

See also 
List of national parks of France

References

External links 

 
National parks of France
Geography of Alpes-de-Haute-Provence
Geography of Alpes-Maritimes
Tourist attractions in Alpes-de-Haute-Provence
Tourist attractions in Alpes-Maritimes
Rock art in France
Protected areas established in 1979
Protected areas of the Alps